Rodney Wallace is an American mixed martial artist currently competing in the Heavyweight division. A professional competitor since 2008, he has competed for the UFC, Bellator, the MFC, M-1 Global, KSW, and Absolute Championship Berkut.

Background
Wallace was born in Bamberg, South Carolina, moved to Passaic, New Jersey when he was one year old, then returned to his birthplace at the age of 13 when he began playing football and wrestling. At Bamberg-Ehrhardt High School, Wallace competed in both sports as well as track and field. He reached the state tournament in wrestling when he was freshman, then won the South Carolina state championship in his sophomore, junior, and senior years. Wallace continued his football career with a scholarship to NCAA Division II Catawba College in Salisbury, North Carolina where he was an All-Conference running back from 2001–2004 and finished his career as the school's all-time leading rusher.

Mixed martial arts career

Ultimate Fighting Championship
Wallace lost his UFC debut at The Ultimate Fighter 10 Finale by unanimous decision to former WEC Light Heavyweight Champion Brian Stann.

Wallace next fought Jared Hamman on March 27, 2010, at UFC 111. Wallace lost this fight by way of a unanimous decision (29-28, 29-28, 29-28). This fight was very fast paced and there were several situations in which both men were rocked. The fight was selected as Fight of the Night, earning both fighters $65,000.

Wallace was scheduled to face Stanislav Nedkov on August 7, 2010, at UFC 117. However, Nedkov was forced from the card with an injury and was replaced by Phil Davis. Wallace lost the fight via unanimous decision.

Following the loss to Davis, Wallace was released from the promotion.

Independent promotions
After his release from the UFC, Wallace went on to face and defeat David Heath at MFC 27 via unanimous decision. He lost his second fight for the promotion against Emanuel Newton at MFC 28 via submission.

Wallace next faced Cale Yarbrough on April 15, 2011, at Scrap Live: Fight Night 7.

Rodney Wallace next fought Derrick Mehmen at WMMA 1: Fighting for a Better World on March 31, 2012. Wallace won this fight via unanimous decision.

Wallace next competed against Polish fighter Mamed Khalidov on May 12, 2012, at KSW XIX. He lost the fight via knockout in the first round.

Rodney Wallace next fought former WEC Middleweight Champion Paulo Filho to a draw at Selva MMA on August 4, 2013, in Brazil.

Bellator MMA
Wallace made his debut for Bellator MMA on April 11, 2014, at Bellator 116. He faced Carlos Eduardo and won the fight via unanimous decision.

Wallace faced Kelly Anundson on June 6, 2014, at Bellator 121. He lost the fight by unanimous decision.

In August 2014, Wallace was released from Bellator, along with twelve other fighters.

Absolute Championship Berkut
Wallace faced Shamil Gamzatov on January 13, 2017, at ACB 51. He lost the fight by split decision.

Bare knuckle boxing career
He challenged Croatian Marko Martinjak for his UBBADA world cruiserweight title at BKB 5 event in Coventry on April 22, 2017, losing the fight via first round TKO due to a cut above the eye.

Championships and accomplishments
SMASH Fight
SMASH Fight Light Heavyweight Championship (One time, current)
Ultimate Fighting Championship
Fight of the Night (One time) vs. Jared Hamman 
Warfare FC
WFC Light Heavyweight Championship (One time, current)
Hard Knocks Fighting
HKFC Light Heavyweight Championship (One time, current)

Mixed martial arts record

|-
| Loss
|  align=center| 26–16–1
| Konstantin Gluhov
| KO (spinning back kick to the body)
| ProFC 63
| 
| align=center| 2
| align=center| 2:58
| Rostov-on-Don, Russia
|
|-
| Loss
|  align=center| 26–15–1
| Juan Espino
| Decision (unanimous)
| Combate Comas MMA 3
| 
| align=center| 3
| align=center| 5:00
| Santa Cruz, Bolivia
|
|-
| Loss
|  align=center| 26–14–1
| Ivan Shtyrkov
| Decision (unanimous)
| RCC Boxing Promotions
| 
| align=center| 3
| align=center| 5:00
| Chelyabinsk, Russia
|Heavyweight debut.
|-
| Loss
|  align=center| 26–13–1
| Shamil Gamzatov
| Decision (split)
| |ACB 51: Silva vs. Torgeson
| 
| align=center| 3
| align=center| 5:00
| Irvine, California, United States
|
|-
| Win
| align=center| 26–12–1
| Julio Gallegos
| Decision (unanimous)
| Conflict MMA 42
| 
| align=center| 3
| align=center| 5:00
| Indian Trail, North Carolina, United States
|
|-
| Loss
| align=center| 25–12–1
| Isa Umarov
| Decision (unanimous)
| |ACB 38: Breakthrough
| 
| align=center| 3
| align=center| 5:00
| Rostov-on-Don, Russia
|
|-
| Loss
| align=center| 25–11–1
| Saparbek Safarov
| TKO (retirement)
| Akhmat Fight Show 18: Grand Prix 2016
| 
| align=center| 2
| align=center| 5:00
| Grozny, Russia
|
|-
| Win
| align=center| 25–10–1
| Daniel Spohn
| Decision (unanimous)
| HKFC: Hard Knocks 48
| 
| align=center| 5
| align=center| 5:00
| Calgary, Alberta, Canada
| 
|-
| Win
| align=center| 24–10–1
| Adrian Miles
| Submission (rear-naked choke)
| HKFC: Hard Knocks 47
| 
| align=center| 5
| align=center| 2:36
| Calgary, Alberta, Canada
| 
|-
| Win
| align=center| 23–10–1
| Kalib Starnes
| Decision (unanimous)
| HKFC: Hard Knocks 44
| 
| align=center| 3
| align=center| 5:00
| Calgary, Alberta, Canada
| 
|-
| Loss
| align=center| 22–10–1
| Misha Cirkunov
| TKO (head kick)
| HKFC: Hard Knocks 41
| 
| align=center| 1
| align=center| 2:00
| Calgary, Alberta, Canada
| 
|-
| Win
| align=center| 22–9–1
| Clay Davidson
| Decision (unanimous)
| HKFC: Hard Knocks 40
| 
| align=center| 3
| align=center| 5:00
| Calgary, Alberta, Canada
| 
|-
| Loss
| align=center| 21–9–1
| Kelly Anundson
| Decision (unanimous)
| Bellator 121
| 
| align=center| 3
| align=center| 5:00
| Thackerville, Oklahoma, United States
| 
|-
| Win
| align=center| 21–8–1
| Ariel Gandulla
| Decision (unanimous)
| HKFC: Hard Knocks 36
| 
| align=center| 3
| align=center| 5:00
| Fort St. John, British Columbia, Canada
| 
|-
| Win
| align=center| 20–8–1
| Carlos Eduardo
| Decision (unanimous)
| Bellator 116
| 
| align=center| 3
| align=center| 5:00
| Temecula, California, United States
| 
|-
| Loss
| align=center| 19–8–1
| Maxim Grishin
| Decision (split)
| Driven MMA: One
| 
| align=center| 3
| align=center| 5:00
| Canton, Ohio, United States
| 
|-
| Loss
| align=center| 19–7–1
| Luiz Cane
| KO (flying knee)
| SFT 1
| 
| align=center| 1
| align=center| 3:56
| São Paulo, São Paulo, Brazil
| 
|-
| Draw
| align=center| 19–6–1
| Paulo Filho
| Draw (time limit)
| Selva MMA 2
| 
| align=center| 5
| align=center| 5:00
| Rio Branco, Brazil
| 
|-
| Win
| align=center| 19–6
| Matheus Wendell Santi Scheffel
| TKO (punches)
| SMASH Fight 2
| 
| align=center| 2
| align=center| 2:56
| Curitiba, Paraná, Brazil
| 
|-
| Win
| align=center| 18–6
| Aaron Johnson
| KO (punches)
| Warfare FC 9: Apocalypse
| 
| align=center| 1
| align=center| 2:00
| North Myrtle Beach, South Carolina, United States
| 
|-
| Win
| align=center| 17–6
| Salomão Ribeiro
| Decision (unanimous)
| Jungle Fight 53
| 
| align=center| 3
| align=center| 5:00
| Japeri, Rio de Janeiro, Brazil
| 
|-
| Win
| align=center| 16–6
| Joaquim Ferreira
| TKO (punches)
| SMASH Fight 1
| 
| align=center| 3
| align=center| 1:22
| Curitiba, Paraná, Brazil
| 
|-
| Win
| align=center| 15–6
| Guilherme Viana
| Decision (split)
| Iron Fight Combat 2
| 
| align=center| 3
| align=center| 5:00
| Aracaju, Sergipe, Brazil
| 
|-
| Loss
| align=center| 14–6
| Michal Materla
| KO (punches)
| KSW 21: Final Resolution
| 
| align=center| 1
| align=center| 0:22
| Warsaw, Poland
| 
|-
| Win
| align=center| 14–5
| Cristiano Lazzarini
| TKO (punches)
| Brasil Fight 6: Brasil x EUA
| 
| align=center| 2
| align=center| 4:28
| Belo Horizonte, Minas Gerais, Brazil
| 
|-
| Win
| align=center| 13–5
| Aaron Johnson
| KO (punch)
| RFN: Renaissance Fight Night
| 
| align=center| 4
| align=center| 4:00
| Montgomery, Alabama, United States
| 
|-
| Loss
| align=center| 12–5
| Mamed Khalidov
| KO (punch)
| KSW 19
| 
| align=center| 1
| align=center| 1:55
| Lódz, Poland
|Catchweight (187 lbs) bout.
|-
| Win
| align=center| 12–4
| Derrick Mehmen
| Decision (unanimous)
| WMMA 1: Fighting for a Better World
| 
| align=center| 3
| align=center| 5:00
| El Paso, Texas, United States
| 
|-
| Win
| align=center| 11–4
| Cale Yarbrough
| Decision (unanimous)
| Scrap Live: Fight Night 7
| 
| align=center| 3
| align=center| 5:00
| Winston-Salem, North Carolina, United States
| 
|-
| Loss
| align=center| 10–4
| Emanuel Newton
| Submission (rear-naked choke)
| MFC 28: Supremacy
| 
| align=center| 2
| align=center| 4:34
| Enoch, Alberta, Canada
| 
|-
| Win
| align=center| 10–3
| David Heath
| Decision (unanimous)
| MFC 27
| 
| align=center| 3
| align=center| 5:00
| Enoch, Alberta, Canada
| 
|-
| Loss
| align=center| 9–3
| Phil Davis
| Decision (unanimous)
| UFC 117
| 
| align=center| 3
| align=center| 5:00
| Oakland, California, United States
| 
|-
| Loss
| align=center| 9–2
| Jared Hamman
| Decision (unanimous)
| UFC 111
| 
| align=center| 3
| align=center| 5:00
| Newark, New Jersey, United States
| 
|-
| Loss
| align=center| 9–1
| Brian Stann
| Decision (unanimous)
| The Ultimate Fighter: Heavyweights Finale
| 
| align=center| 3
| align=center| 5:00
| Las Vegas, Nevada, United States
| 
|-
| Win
| align=center| 9–0
| Gregory Milliard
| Decision (unanimous)
| VFC: A Night Of Vengeance
| 
| align=center| 3
| align=center| 5:00
| Oranjestad, Aruba
| 
|-
| Win
| align=center| 8–0
| Aaron Stark
| Submission (kimura)
| VFC: A Night Of Vengeance
| 
| align=center| 2
| align=center| 2:18
| Oranjestad, Aruba
| 
|-
| Win
| align=center| 7–0
| Antwain Britt
| Submission (armbar)
| VFC: A Night Of Vengeance
| 
| align=center| 1
| align=center| 3:59
| Oranjestad, Aruba
| 
|-
| Win
| align=center| 6–0
| Marcus Vanttinen
| Decision (unanimous)
| M-1 Challenge 16: USA
| 
| align=center| 2
| align=center| 5:00
| Kansas City, Kansas, United States
| 
|-
| Win
| align=center| 5–0
| Michael Brown
| Decision (unanimous)
| RFC: Revolution Fight Club 3
| 
| align=center| 3
| align=center| 5:00
| Miami, Florida, United States
| 
|-
| Win
| align=center| 4–0
| Carlos Zevallos
| TKO (punches)
| RFC: Revolution Fight Club 2
| 
| align=center| 1
| align=center| 0:08
| Miami, Florida, United States
| 
|-
| Win
| align=center| 3–0
| Ovince St. Preux
| Decision (unanimous)
| VFC 1: Vengeance Fighting Championship 1
| 
| align=center| 3
| align=center| 5:00
| Concord, North Carolina, United States
| 
|-
| Win
| align=center| 2–0
| Toni Valtonen
| Decision (unanimous)
| M-1 Challenge 3: Gran Canaria
| 
| align=center| 2
| align=center| 5:00
| San Agustin, Grand Canaria, Spain
| 
|-
| Win
| align=center| 1–0
| Wesley Cantillo
| Decision (unanimous)
| RFC 1: Revolution Fight Club 1
| 
| align=center| 3
| align=center| 5:00
| Ft. Lauderdale, Florida, United States
|

References

External links
 
 

American male mixed martial artists
Light heavyweight mixed martial artists
Mixed martial artists utilizing collegiate wrestling
African-American mixed martial artists
Living people
People from Bamberg, South Carolina
1981 births
Catawba Indians football players
Mixed martial artists from South Carolina
People from Charlotte, North Carolina
People from Salisbury, North Carolina
Mixed martial artists from North Carolina
Ultimate Fighting Championship male fighters
American male sport wrestlers
Amateur wrestlers
21st-century African-American sportspeople
20th-century African-American people